Michael Aaron Ballard (born February 6, 1984) is a former professional baseball pitcher.

Baseball career

Amateur career
Ballard went to Ocean Lakes High School, where he led the team to a second-place finish in the 2001 Virginia AAA State Tournament, setting a school record in ERA with a 0.69 ERA. He was drafted in the 50th round, 1474th overall, in the 2002 MLB Draft by the Minnesota Twins, but he decided to go to the University of Virginia.
His 2003 season was cut short due to injury, where, in his seven starts, he had a 1.93 ERA in 7 starts. He missed all of 2004 due to injury. He was solid in 2005, where he went 8–3 with a 3.54 ERA over 15 starts. In 2005, he played collegiate summer baseball with the Orleans Cardinals of the Cape Cod Baseball League. Ballard was drafted again by the Minnesota Twins, in the 47th round, 1415th overall, of the 2005 Draft, but decided to stay for his senior year. His senior year was less impressive, with a 4.09 ERA, despite having a 9–3 record and two complete games. He was drafted in the 14th round, 418th overall, by the Texas Rangers in the 2006 MLB Draft, and decided to sign.

Professional career
He started 2006 with Short-Season Spokane, where he went 2–7 with a 5.68 ERA. He started 2007 with Single-A Clinton, where he went 9-4 before earning a promotion to High-A Bakersfield. He started 2008 with Double-A Frisco, where he went 8-3 before earning a promotion to Triple-A Oklahoma. He split 2009 with Frisco and newly renamed Oklahoma City. He spent all of 2010 with Oklahoma City after earning a spring training visit. In the offseason, he signed with the Baltimore Orioles as a minor league free agent. He started the season with Triple-A Norfolk, but was demoted to Double-A Bowie after a 4.91 ERA.

On July 31, 2011, Ballard was called up to replace the struggling Jason Berken. However, he never appeared in a game.

On December 27, 2011, Ballard signed a minor league deal with the Washington Nationals with an invite to spring training. He signed with the CPBL's Brother Elephants for the 2013 season.

References

External links

Virginia Cavaliers Player Bio

Baseball players from Norfolk, Virginia
Virginia Cavaliers baseball players
Orleans Firebirds players
Spokane Indians players
Clinton LumberKings players
Bakersfield Blaze players
Frisco RoughRiders players
Oklahoma RedHawks players
Oklahoma City RedHawks players
Norfolk Tides players
Bowie Baysox players
Harrisburg Senators players
1984 births
Living people
Brother Elephants players